Fear Stalk is a 1989 American made-for-television thriller drama film starring Jill Clayburgh and Stephen Macht. It was directed by Larry Shaw from a teleplay written by Ellen Weston and broadcast as the CBS Sunday Night Movie on December 17, 1989.

Plot
Alexandra Maynard (Jill Clayburgh) is a strong-willed soap opera producer whose life is suddenly invaded by a psychopath (Andrew Divoff) after he steals all of the belongings out of her purse. Once in possession of Alexandra's identification and credit cards, her tormentor is able to follow her all over town, anticipating her every move. Adding to Alexandra's agony are threatening phone calls and money being withdrawn from her account by her ubiquitous stalker. Then, Alexandra's friends and family decide to form a united front, and the stalker finds himself the stalkee.

Cast
Jill Clayburgh as Alexandra "Ally" Maynard
Stephen Macht as Tom Hagar
Lynne Thigpen as Barbara
Sandy McPeak as Richard
Mary Ellen Trainor as Jennifer
Lorna Luft as Doris
Cheryl Anderson as Sandy
Sada Thompson as Pearl
Andrew Divoff as Man

Filming
Fear Stalk was shot in Los Angeles, California from September 27 to October 20, 1989.

References

External links

1989 films
1989 television films
1980s thriller drama films
American thriller drama films
Films about television people
Films about stalking
CBS network films
ITC Entertainment films
1989 crime drama films
American drama television films
1980s English-language films
Films directed by Larry Shaw
1980s American films